"Jauné" is a song by French artist Booba released in 2020. The song features vocals from Zed .The song reached number one on the French Singles Chart.

Charts

Certifications

References

2020 singles
2020 songs
French-language songs
SNEP Top Singles number-one singles